Alyssa Brugman (born May 1974) is an Australian author of fiction for young adults.  She was born in Rathmines, a suburb of Lake Macquarie, Australia and attended five public schools before completing a Marketing Degree at the University of Newcastle.  She resides in the Hunter Region.

Career
Brugman has worked as an after-school tutor for Aboriginal children. She taught management, accounting and marketing at a business college, worked for a home improvements company and then worked in Public Relations before becoming a full-time writer.

She submitted her first text, Finding Grace, to The Australian/Vogel Literary Award in 1998. While the novel did not receive an award, it was considered for publication.

Finding Grace was short listed for the 2002 New South Wales Premier's Literary Awards (Ethel Turner Prize), the 2002 Queensland Premier's Literary Awards, the 2002 CBCA Book of the Year (Older Readers), the 2002 Sanderson Young Adult Audio Book of the Year, and the Best Designed Young Adult Book APA Design Awards 2002. It was a 'Commended Book' in the Victorian Premier's Literary Awards 2002 and has been translated into Dutch (for which it has been short listed for the 'Gouden Zoen' Award), Danish, German, and Belgian. The US edition was shortlisted for the Michael Printz Award in 2005.

Walking Naked, Alyssa's second novel was released in August 2002. It won the IBBY Australia Ena Noël Award for Encouragement, it was shortlisted for the Victorian Premier's Literary Award, awarded 'Honour Book' in the 2003 CBCA Book of the Year (Older Readers) and is distributed in the US (where it was listed a Voices of Youth Advocates "Top Shelf Fiction" book 2004), the UK, Germany, Turkey and Portugal.

Brugman's third novel for young adults, Being Bindy was released in mid-2004. It was a CBCA 'Notable Book', and shortlisted for the Children's Peace Literature Award in 2005, and is also available in Swedish and Norwegian.

Brugman has released a series of pony books: For Sale or Swap, Beginner's Luck, Hot Potato, Hide & Seek, and a fifth installment, Greener Pastures. For Sale or Swap was shortlisted for the Kids Own Australian Literature Award 2006, The Young Australian Best Book Awards 2006 and the Children's Choice Book Awards, 2006, and is one of the books select for the 'Books Alive' Campaign in 2007. These books are also sold in Germany.

Solo, her eighth novel, was released in July 2007. It was a CBCA 'Notable Book' in the Older Readers Category in 2008.

The Equen Queen was released in 2008, and is Alyssa's first foray into the children's Fantasy genre. It is the second novel in the Quentaris series published by Ford Street.

Girl Next Door, Alyssa's eleventh novel, was released in February 2009.

Alex as Well was released in January 2013 and is Alyssa's first book released with Text Publishing. It was shortlisted for the 'Western Australian Premiers Award' in 2014. Alex as Well was also published in the UK (2014), US (2015) and Italy (2013).

Brugman writes full-time and lives in the Hunter Region with her partner, children and various quadrupeds and poultry. She is currently pursuing postgraduate studies at the University of Canberra.

Bibliography
Finding Grace (Allen & Unwin, 2002)
Walking Naked (Allen & Unwin, 2002)
Being Bindy (Allen & Unwin, 2004)
For Sale or Swap (Random House, 2005)
Beginner's Luck (Random House, 2005)
Hot Potato (Random House, 2006)
Hide & Seek (Random House, 2005)
Solo (Allen & Unwin, 2007)
Greener Pastures (Random House, 2008)
The Equen Queen (Ford Street, 2008)
Girl Next Door (Random House, 2009)
Alex As Well (Text Publishing, 2013)

References

External links

author's website

1974 births
Living people
Australian children's writers
Australian women novelists
20th-century Australian novelists
Australian women children's writers
20th-century Australian women writers